The Trent-class lifeboat is an all-weather lifeboat operated by the Royal National Lifeboat Institution (RNLI) from 30 stations around the coasts of Great Britain and Ireland to provide coverage up to  out to sea. Introduced to service in 1994, the class is named after the River Trent, the second longest river wholly in England.

History
This resulted in the  Trent and   lifeboats.

The prototype for the Trent class was built in 1991. It was used for trials until 1994, when it was put into active service at Alderney Lifeboat Station. It remained on station there until their own boat was available in 1995, since when it has served in the relief fleet. Construction of its sister boats continued until 2004.

Design
The Trent is intended to lie afloat at moorings. It has five water-tight bulkheads to create six compartments: fore peak; fore store; survivor cabin; tank space; machinery space; and aft peak steering compartment. Above these is the main deckhouse which has seats for the six crew and a doctor. This is another water-tight space which provides the boat's self-righting capability.

The Trent has a service life of 25 years, although current estimates appear to exceed these original operational confines due to constant on-station maintenance, periodic refitting and sporadic repairs. In comparison with its predecessors, the boat has numerous additional advantages which aid in the overall success of every launch. One detail would be its condensed hull, which allows it to operate in significantly constrained locations (such as marina berths and dense quayside scenes).

Another aspect aiding in its confined manoeuvrability would be the bilge keels which aid in protecting its twin drive props. Its hull sheerline sweeps down into an area known as the 'welldeck', which helps ease the recovery of casualties onto the lifeboat. The remote location of an 'a-frame' hoist also provides additional assistance for particularly awkward recoveries (such as casualties in stretchers).

As of 2006, each Trent class lifeboat is complemented with an array of advanced technologies. Each device provides full assistance in search and rescue operations, and therefore must be of an officially high standard. The comprehensive electronics fit includes full radio equipment including Navtex Multi-Frequency, Marine Very High Frequency and DSC installations. For navigation the crew utilize an array of digital select systems including DGPS equipment, and an electronic Laserplot chart display and information system which allows complete automated management via the vessel's on-board processors (autohelm), although comparatively infrequent in practice.

Other features of Trent class lifeboats include VHF/DF, radar and weather sensors. Provisions for survivors include complete first aid equipment including the Basket and Neill Robertson stretchers, oxygen and Entonox breathing systems, ambulance pouch, thermodynamic food canisters and sick bags for ailing casualties. The Trents also have a small toilet arrangement. The afterdeck houses a salvage pump in a water-tight container for use in inter-vessel salvage, and two fire hoses allow proficient fire fighting. The Trent carries an inflatable XP-boat which is powered by a 5 hp outboard engine, and can be deployed in slight conditions to gain access to rocks or beaches when an inshore lifeboat is otherwise unavailable.

Fleet

References

External links 

RNLI Fleet:Trent Class

Royal National Lifeboat Institution lifeboats